Help! The Doctor Is Drowning is a 1974 Dutch comedy film directed by Nikolai van der Heyde. It was the most popular Dutch film of the year and one of the most popular of all time.

Cast
 Jules Croiset as Dokter Angelino
 Martine Bijl as Irene Muller
 Piet Bambergen as Aannemer Bram Van Tienen
 Willeke van Ammelrooy as Katja
 Ward de Ravet as Meneer Pastoor
 Leen Jongewaard as Veldwachter Van Bree
 Fanny Winkler as Ella
 Romain DeConinck as Herman de Rechtvaardige
 Frans Mulder as Kareltje
 Geert Thijssens as Everhard van Dungen
 Betsy Smeets as Barones
 Onno Molenkamp as Baron
 Henk O'Breen as Professor

Release
The film was the most successful Dutch film of the year with 1,088,000 admissions in the Netherlands.

It was entered into the 1975 Melbourne International Film Festival. It was also selected as the Dutch entry for the Best Foreign Language Film at the 47th Academy Awards, but was not accepted as a nominee.

See also
 List of submissions to the 47th Academy Awards for Best Foreign Language Film
 List of Dutch submissions for the Academy Award for Best Foreign Language Film

References

External links
 

1974 films
1974 comedy films
1970s Dutch-language films
Films directed by Nikolai van der Heyde